Not a Little Girl Anymore is a studio album by English singer Linda Lewis, first released in 1975. It was Lewis’ fourth album and it peaked at number 40 in the UK album chart. The album features, along with the lighter songs such as the cover of Cat Steven’s "(Remember the Days of) The Old School Yard" and the gentle pastiche "My Grandaddy Could Reggae", more sultry numbers such as "This Time I’ll be Sweeter" and "It's in His Kiss". Her album made clear the intention of re-branding the singer, moving her towards a more adult audience.

Track listing

Side One
"(Remember the Days of) The Old Schoolyard" – (Cat Stevens)
"It's in His Kiss" – (Rudy Clark)
"This Time I'll Be Sweeter" – (Pat Grant, Gwen Guthrie)
"Rock and Roller Coaster" – (Lewis)
"Not a Little Girl Anymore" – (David Bartlett, Emilio Castillo, Stephen Kupka)

Side Two
"Love Where Are You Now" – (Ian Samwell, Bobby Tench)
"My Grandaddy Could Reggae" – (Lewis)
"I Do My Best to Impress" – (Lewis)
"May You Never" – (John Martyn)
"Love, Love, Love" – (Lewis)

2011 Re-master CD bonus tracks
"Walk About" - (Lewis) - B-side of "It's in His Kiss"
"The Seaside Song" - (Lewis) - B-side of "Rock and Roller Coaster"
"Cordon Blues" - (Lewis)
"So Many Mysteries to Find" - (Lewis)
"Baby I'm Yours" - (Van McCoy) - 1976 single
"It All Comes Back to Love" (Linda Lewis) - B-side of "Winter Wonderland"
"The Other Side" - (Lewis) - B-side of "Baby I'm Yours"
"Winter Wonderland" - (Felix Bernard, Dick Smith) - 1976 single

Personnel
Linda Lewis - vocals
Robert Ahwai, Jeff Mironov, Jerry Friedman, Lance Quinn, Jim Cregan, Snowy White - guitar
Bernie Holland - acoustic guitar
Lowell George - slide guitar
Phil Chen, Bob Babbitt, Clive Chaman - bass
Max Middleton, Derek Smith, Duncan Mackay, Jean Roussel - keyboards
Richard Bailey, Gerry Conway - drums
Jack Jennings, Phil Kraus, Teddy Sommers - percussion
Carlos Martin, Darryl Lee Que - congas
Tower of Power - horn section; arranged by Greg Adams
Steve Gregory - saxophone, flute
Lenny Pickett - flute
Anne Peacock, Linda Lewis, Capability Brown, Domino, Liza Strike - background vocals
Technical
Bob Clearmountain, Phil McDonald, Tony Bongiovi - engineer

References

The Guinness Book of British Hit Albums, fifth edition, 1992
http://www.allmusic.com/album/not-a-little-girl-anymore-r2109111
Arista Records original record sleeve notes

1975 albums
Arista Records albums
Linda Lewis albums
Albums recorded at Apple Studios